Jerry Hendrik Marius Nijman (born August 10, 1966 in Paramaribo) is a retired boxer from The Netherlands, who was born in Suriname. He represented Netherlands at the 1992 Summer Olympics in Barcelona, Spain, where he was eliminated in the second round of the super heavyweight division (+ 91 kg) by Germany's Wilhelm Fischer.

External links
 Dutch Olympic Committee

1968 births
Living people
Heavyweight boxers
Super-heavyweight boxers
Boxers at the 1992 Summer Olympics
Olympic boxers of the Netherlands
Surinamese emigrants to the Netherlands
Sportspeople from Paramaribo
Dutch male boxers
Surinamese male boxers